Svratouch is a municipality and village in Chrudim District in the Pardubice Region of the Czech Republic. It has about 900 inhabitants.

Administrative parts
The village of Karlštejn is an administrative part of Svratouch.

See also
Earth-grazing meteoroid of 13 October 1990

References

External links

 

Villages in Chrudim District